Do Your Duty is a 1928 American silent comedy film directed by William Beaudine. This is lost film.

Cast
 Charles Murray as Tim Maloney (as Charlie Murray)
 Lucien Littlefield as Andy McIntosh
 Charles Delaney as Danny Sheehan Jr
 Ed Brady as Ritzy Dalton
 Blue Washington as Dude Jackson
 Doris Dawson as Mary Ellen Maloney
 Aggie Herring as Mrs. Maloney
 George C. Pearce as Captain Dan Sheehan (as George Pierce)

References

External links
 
 

1928 films
1928 comedy films
Silent American comedy films
American silent feature films
American black-and-white films
Films directed by William Beaudine
Lost American films
1928 lost films
Lost comedy films
1920s American films